The St. Mark's School of Texas is a nonsectarian preparatory day school for boys in grades 1–12 in Dallas, Texas, United States, accredited by the Independent Schools Association of the Southwest.

History
St. Mark's traces its origins to the Terrill School for Boys, which was founded by Menter B. Terrill in 1906. The six original teachers included Terrill, who had been valedictorian at Yale, as well as his wife, Ada (one of the first female graduate students at Yale), and his father, James, a former college president.  Terrill's school was explicitly intended to rival east coast prep schools. Terrill quickly recruited the sons of some of Dallas's most affluent citizens and also boarding students from throughout the southwest. By 1915, Terrill School sent 14 of its 33 graduates to Ivy League colleges.

As headmaster, Terrill encouraged Miss Ela Hockaday to open a girls' school in Dallas in 1913. Schools descended from Terrill have had some affiliation with the Hockaday School for over a century, with shared social events, artistic performances, and some classes.

During the decade of the 1910s, Terrill began to recruit enough athletes (including boarders in a postgraduate year) to successfully compete against much larger high schools as well as teams of college freshmen from Rice, SMU, and TCU. The football team’s record during that decade was 67 wins, 2 ties, and one loss (in 1915 to the freshman team from the University of Texas at Austin). Five games between 1912 and 1918 ended with Terrill's football team shutting out their opponents while scoring over 100 points. These undefeated seasons continued through the 1920s, with the teams often being led by well-known coaches. For example, one head coach of that era, Eugene Neely, had starred in football at Dartmouth, despite having lost an arm in a hunting accident at age 14. Another coach, Monroe Sweeney, left Terrill for Major League Baseball, where he umpired 412 games. Another, Pete Cawthon, left Terrill to coach at Austin College, bringing with him 7 of his Terrill players; Cawthon went on to become head football coach for Texas Tech and the Brooklyn Dodgers of the National Football League as well as the athletic director for the University of Alabama.  In 1930, the football team was undefeated and unscored upon, and the basketball team won a prep school national championship.

While its football team was rarely tested, Terrill did face academic competition from Texas Country Day School, which was founded in 1933 with 10 boys and four teachers. Within two years of its creation, Texas Country Day was advertising that its faculty included "Rhodes Scholar and Harvard, Dartmouth, and Amherst men."

In the context of the Great Depression, World War II, no endowment, and a small student body, Terrill School failed by 1946. Terrill re-emerged as the Episcopal-associated Cathedral School for Boys in 1946. 
Within four years of Terrill's demise, several local business leaders tried again to create an elite Dallas institution by merging Texas Country Day (1933–1950) and the Cathedral School (1946–1950) effective in September 1950.

St. Mark's is the result of this merger, and it was immediately and robustly supported by some of Dallas's most successful businessmen of the post-World War II era. Beginning in the 1950s, for example, two of the founders of Texas Instruments donated a total of nearly $50 million, helping to create the solid endowment and modern campus. By the 1960s, Time''' magazine called St. Mark's the "best equipped day school in the country."

The modern school

In contrast to the Terrill School, which was created and spearheaded by its eponymous founder (and then failed after he died), St. Mark's has been driven by donors, most of whom have actively served on its board of trustees. As D Magazine once asserted, "there are some prep schools where the headmaster embodies the institution’s traditions and goals. St. Mark’s is not one of them. St. Mark’s has its roots in its board of directors, which in turn is rooted in the city’s most-established establishment – oil, high technology and, in the old days, cotton."

From the school's inception, members of the board focused on creating an endowment and encouraging the study of science. In the 1960s and 1970s, Texas Instruments' co-founders Cecil H. Green and Eugene McDermott donated a math and science quadrangle, the main library, the greenhouse, the planetarium and the observatory.

The early emphasis on science facilities was not random. As a former St. Mark's headmaster once said: "St. Mark's is a Sputnik school pragmatically established by industrialists who were interested in turning out scientists." The science facilities have contributed to the career development of a number of future scientists, including Alan Stern, who traces his role as principal investigator of NASA's New Horizons mission to Pluto, to his early participation in the St. Mark's planetarium, observatory, and astronomy club.

The expansion of interests outside of science is reflected in the names of the buildings that are neatly scattered on its 42-acre North Dallas campus. For example, funding for Centennial Hall was spearheaded by a $10 million donation from the family of Harlan Crow, while Kenneth A. Hersh ‘81 largely funded the Robert K. Hoffman ‘65 Center.
Other major donors have included Ralph Rogers, who donated the natatorium, the family of Lamar Hunt, which donated a football stadium, the Roosevelt family, which contributed a carillon and a Letourneau pipe organ, and Tom Hicks, who funded for a new gymnasium. The Lower School has its own library, while the main library, named after Ida and Cecil H. Green, is heavily computerized but also features 56,000 volumes.

Other major contributors have included parents or alumni Algur H. Meadows, Charles Nearburg ‘68, Ross Perot, Jr. ‘77, and Everette DeGolyer.

St. Mark's was rated in 2016 as having one of the ten most beautiful high school campuses in the state.

Much of the McDermott-Green Science Center was replaced in January 2019 by the Winn Science Center. Designed by Robert A.M. Stern, the Winn Center includes a new planetarium and greenhouse, classrooms, and labs that focus on DNA science, engineering, biotechnology, and robotics. The new facilities also expand an ongoing project with the University of Texas at Austin which allows students to have direct internet access to observatories in Alpine, Texas and rural Peru. The science center was spearheaded by a $10 million gift from Steven Winn ‘64 and completed through $40 million in gifts from 57 other families.

In October of 2019, an EF-3 tornado damaged multiple buildings on campus, though classes quickly resumed, and the buildings repaired or rebuilt. The tornado also uprooted and damaged more than 230 trees on the campus and destroyed many of the houses in the neighborhood surrounding the school.

Headmasters

 Menter B. Terrill (1906–1916), Terrill School
 M. B. Bogarte (1916–1931), Terrill School
 Sam "Pop" Davis (1931–1946), Terrill School
 Rev. Charles A. Mason (1946-1948), Cathedral School for Boys
 Rev. Alfred L. Alley (1948-1950), Cathedral School for Boys
 Kenneth Bouvé (1933–1949), Texas Country Day
 Robert Iglehart (1949–1956), Texas Country Day and St. Mark's
 L. Ralston Thomas (1956–1957)
 Thomas B. Hartmann (1957–1963)
 Christopher Berrisford (1963–1969)
 John T. Whatley (1969–1983)
 David Hicks (1983–1993)
 Arnold Holtberg (1993–2014)
 David Dini (2014–present)

Statistics

As of 2021, the school's 904 students are spread across first through twelfth grade, with 412 in the Upper School, 342 in the Middle School, and 152 in the Lower School. Average class size is 16, and the overall student/faculty ratio is 8:1. Of the 127 full-time faculty members, 97 have advanced degrees, including 11 with doctorates. As of 2021, 30% of the teachers had worked at the school for at least twenty years. There are 22 fully endowed faculty positions, including 16 Master Teaching chairs. Male: female ratio among teachers is 50:50.

19% of applicants were accepted to St. Mark's in 2020. Of those accepted, 92% enrolled at St. Mark's. 98% of St. Mark's students continued into the next grade at St. Mark's in 2018 (i.e., the school had a 98% retention rate).

For the 4th consecutive year, the 2019-20 Annual Fund yielded over $4 million. For the 12th consecutive year, over half of the school's alumni donated to the annual fund, as did about 90% of the parents. Total gift receipts in 2019-20 were $9.3 million. As of 2020, the school's endowment was $140 million. This translates into an endowment of over $117,000 per student. 17% of students received financial aid for the 2018–19 school year, with an overall outlay for financial aid of $2.8 million. Average tuition (inclusive of books and fees) is $30,622.

While the first African-American student did not enter St. Mark's until 1965, 47% of the school's 877 boys are now students of color, a group that includes boys who identify as African American, Asian American, and Hispanic.

Graduation requirements include participation in the freshman-year 10-day Pecos camping trip and 4 years of physical education (and/or participation on sports teams). All students must perform 4 years of community service (15+ hours/year). Students must also take the equivalent 18 full-year courses during Upper School, including 4 years of English and 3 years each of lab science, social studies, mathematics, and a foreign language, as well as one year of a fine art. In addition, all students must satisfactorily complete a Senior Exhibition, in which each boy creates a project that demonstrates a special talent, skill, or interest to the faculty and the rest of the student body.

In the last three years (2020-2022), a total of about 300 seniors have graduated. Most common college matriculations over these 3 years include UT Austin (34), SMU (18), Harvard (13), Texas A&M (11), Northwestern (10), Dartmouth (9), Georgetown (9), MIT (9), University of Chicago (9), Brown (6), Rice (6), Santa Clara (6), Vanderbilt (6), and Yale (6). 

Academics

For the class of 2022, the median SAT was 1530 (780 Math; 750 Reading and Writing). The median ACT was 35. Both of these scores are at the 99th percentile nationally.

22 AP courses are offered at SM. Students took a total of 730 tests in 2022. 78% of these tests resulted in a score of 4 or 5. 

Among the 99 seniors in the class of 2022, 22 were named Semifinalists by the National Merit Scholarship Corporation, and 33 others earned Commended status. Recent graduating classes have scored similarly well: Class of 2021 (32 Semifinalists, 25 Commended), Class of 2020 (26 Semifinalists, 29 Commended) and Class of 2019 (31 Semifinalists, 28 Commended).

The 4-student Upper School Quiz Bowl team won the National Academic Quiz Tournaments’s National Championship for charter and private schools in 2017, 2021, and 2022. In 2022, SM’s “A” team finished first and the “B” team finished 3rd in this contest, which annually invites the 55 best teams in the country. 
 
A member of the class of 2019 won a Jeopardy! Teen Tournament episode.

The SM 4th grade team finished 1st nationally in the most competitive division of the WordMasters Challenge in 2022; earlier SM classes had finished 1st nationally in 2015, 2016, 2017, 2018, and 2021. In 2022, 14 SM students earned perfect scores; a total of 67 students in the country earned perfect scores on that test. About 125,000 4th graders annually take the Challenge, which tests vocabulary, analogies, and word usage.

In 2003 and 2019, respectively, an SM middle schooler won the Scripps National Spelling Bee. In the more recent competition, a 7th grader tied for first after having also won the 2018 national spelling bee for students of South Asian descent and after having placed in the top 40 in the Scripps competition in both 2017 and 2018.

In 2016, a senior was a finalist in the Intel Science Talent Search; he was one of forty finalists nationwide and the only Texan.

In 2020, an SM student finished 5th out of 16,000 participants in the U.S. National Chemistry Olympiad. In 2019, he finished in the top 20.

In 2014, a student won his second straight Indian national championship in the International Mathematical Olympiad.

Most external recognition of faculty is through the success of their students. Some teachers are, however, specifically recognized. In 2021, Ray Westbrook, a SM teacher since 2001, was named the National High School Journalism Teacher of the Year by the Columbia Scholastic Press Association. In 2020, Westbrook had won one of the four annual Pioneer Awards from the National Scholastic Press Association. In 2019, John Mead won the Evolution Education Award from the National Association of Biology Teachers, a recognition given to one K-12 teacher every other year from around the country. Mead had been recognized as Texas's best biology teacher in 2018. A SM math teacher, Robin Lynn Macy went on to help form the Dixie Chicks. Some SM coaches were most externally recognized prior to SM. For example, Daniel Nevot was a highly successful fencing coach for 25 years, but he had earlier won the Legion d'Honneur for his efforts as one of the Free French during World War II. Much earlier, the school recruited the 1938 Heisman Trophy winner, Davey O'Brien, to be its three-days-a-week football coach; 61 of 65 high school boys tried out for spring football that year."All but 4 of 65 Boys in School Try Out For Davey's Team" Galveston Daily News March 10, 1939. Retrieved February 3, 2018

For the past three years (2019-2021), one national rating service has concluded that St. Mark's is the country’s best K-12 private school and the country’s best boys school. That same organization has also asserted that SM is the state’s best private school as well as the state's best high school (public or private) for STEM (science, technology, engineering, and math). St. Mark's, itself, has shrugged off such rankings, underlining that no school is the best fit for all children and, more pragmatically, that there is no way to meaningfully compare schools from different regions with different strengths, limitations, student bodies, and educational goals.

Athletics
85% of Upper School boys play at least one of the 17 varsity sports that are offered at St. Mark's.

Varsity teams primarily compete with the sixteen other private schools in Texas and Oklahoma comprising the Southwest Preparatory Conference (SPC).

In the 2019-20 year that was shortened by the coronavirus, SM teams won 4 out of 7 conference championships, and, for the 12th time since 2007, the program won the SPC Directors Cup, an overall measure of conference success.

Some individual teams have had lengthy periods of success. Lacrosse won 9 conference championships between 2004 and 2013. The swim team won 20 conference championships between 1995 and 2016. The tennis team won 13 conference championships between 1975 and 1990. Water polo won 15 regional championships between 2001 and 2016. Wrestling won 37 conference championships between 1973 and 2015, as well as 13 state championships. The water polo team won 6 Texas state championships between 2014 and 2021.  Much earlier, between 1910 and 1932, the Terrill football team won 144 games, lost 23, and tied 8; during those 23 seasons, the school lost only 4 times to high school teams (the other losses were to teams of college freshmen).

Some well-known alumni were athletes while at St. Mark's. For example, Luke Wilson was part of a 1989 record-setting 4x400 relay team (3:21.38); that time was the conference record for over 20 years and a school record until April 2022. Before taking up acting professionally, Tommy Lee Jones went on to become an all-conference offensive lineman for Harvard's football team. Boz Scaggs was a track and soccer star while at St. Mark's, though it was also during high school that he took his first guitar lessons from a classmate, Steve Miller; while in high school, they created a band called the Marksmen.

Four SM alumni have played (or are playing) in the 21st century National Football League: Ty Montgomery '11, Sam Acho '07, Emmanuel Acho ('08), and Kalen Thornton ('00). At least 5 Terrill alumni from the 1920s also played in the NFL: J. B. Andrews (1926), Deck Shelley (1926), Lou Jennings (1923), Charley Malone (1929) and Bill Vaughn (1920).

Multiple alumni have leadership roles in professional sports. Taylor Jenkins ‘03, is head basketball coach of the NBA's Memphis Grizzlies. For MLB's Tampa Bay Rays, which played in the 2020 World Series, Matthew Silverman ‘94 is President of Baseball Operations, Brian Auld ‘95 is President, and Barry Newell '05 is vice president for business operations and analytics. All three came to the Rays from business careers. David Christoff '10 began studying football data on his own after graduating from MIT and is now Director of Football Analytics for the NFL's Las Vegas Raiders. Clark Hunt ‘83 is CEO and co-owner of the NFL's Kansas City Chiefs and MLS's FC Dallas, while Ross Perot, Jr. ‘77 previously owned the NBA’s Dallas Mavericks. Of these seven, none played the varsity college sport for which they are known, though Newell played varsity football at Princeton for 3 years, Auld captained Stanford's varsity lacrosse team, and Hunt captained SMU's varsity soccer team.

Harrison Ingram (‘21) was rated the top high school basketball player in Texas in 2021 and was named to the 24-player McDonald’s All-American team; Ingram played basketball for Stanford , where he was voted the Pac 12 freshman of the year after leading conference freshmen in scoring, rebounds, assists, and steals.

53 SM seniors signed letters of intent to play twelve different varsity collegiate sports in the 5 years between 2018 and 2022.

The following SM teams have won Texas state championships.

Extracurricular activities

As of 2018, St. Mark's recognized 90 extra-curricular clubs and offered 24 fine arts courses.

SM activities that have received consistent national recognition include journalism, creative writing, debate, poetry, photography, chess, and design.

Four different 2019-20 SM publications earned Gold Crowns from the Columbia Scholastic Press Association, an honor that goes to fewer than a dozen publications per category in the country. It was the 8th straight Gold Crown for The Marque, the school’s literary magazine, and the 18th consecutive for The ReMarker, the newspaper, extending the school’s national record for winning this award. In the category of “General Print Magazines,” SM publications (Focus and the Scientific Marksman) won two of the four Gold Crowns awarded in 2019-20. In 2019, the middle school magazine won its 3rd consecutive Gold Crown, an award given to only 1 or 2 publications in the country.

In 2022, The ReMarker was one of 15 high school newspapers in the country to receive a National Pacemaker Award from the National Scholastic Press Association; as of the 2021-22 school year, the newspaper had won this award 14 of the prior 18 years. That same year, SM's The Focus was one of 2 specialty magazine to win the NSPA's top award, its 4th consecutive Pacemaker.  

St. Mark's seniors were named journalist of the year in the state of Texas for eight consecutive years (2013–2020) by the NSPA. In 2019, a senior was named NSPA's national journalist of the year; he became the fourth SM student in 7 years to rank among the country's top three high school journalists.

For the 15th time in 16 years, 2022 SM Photography was named “Top Program” in the annual contest sponsored by the Association of Texas Photography Instructors. The contest annually draws about 7000 entries from about 90 schools.

The debate team has won four national policy debate titles, most recently winning the National Debate Coaches Association title in 2016. In addition, the team won the "world championship" at the 2015 International Public Policy Forum. The school itself annually hosts one of the most prestigious high school debate tournaments in the country, the Heart of Texas Invitational.

In 2021, the Texas Commission on the Arts named an SM student the state poetry champion  through its Poetry Out Loud recitation competition. In 2016, the President's Committee on the Arts and Humanities named an SM senior one of the 5 National Student Poets, selected from over 20,000 applicants.

In 2022, a senior was named one of the country's 20 United States Presidential Scholars in the Arts by the Presidential Scholars Program. Other St. Mark's seniors won that same honor in 2019 and 2020.

In 2014, a St. Mark's student won the national high school chess championship and also became the youngest chess international grandmaster in the Americas. Two other SM students have earned National Master status while still in high school (in 2012 and 2016).

Between 2015 and 2017, four SM students won top awards for design from the nationwide YoungArts competition. In addition, seventeen SM students were finalists in that YoungArts competition between 2009 and 2018. Since 2010, multiple SM students have had their films selected for inclusion in the SXSW film festival. One student had his work profiled in Popular Photography magazine, and another earned seventeen of Scouting's Palm Awards in addition to earning the Eagle Scout rank (a feat achieved by two dozen boys in the history of Scouting).

The avidity with which students pursue extracurricular activities is mocked in the film Rushmore, which was co-written by Owen Wilson '87, who — like the film's protagonist — was asked to leave the school prior to graduation. Rushmore was set at a fictional cross between St. Mark's and Houston's St. John's School, the alma mater of the other co-writer and director, Wes Anderson. The film features a protagonist who participates in dozens of clubs and activities.

The local press has written about ways in which St. Mark's blends in and differs from the rest of Dallas.

National spotlight
St. Mark's and its alumni have been involved in several 21st-century national issues.

One alumnus, Richard Spencer ‘97, is a prominent neo-Nazi who coined the term alt-right and who has punctuated some of his speeches with a Nazi salute. To protest Spencer’s notoriety and anti-immigration views, his SM classmates began an online fundraiser in November 2016 to assist refugees to Dallas. As of November 2018, the fundraiser had raised $64,000. Appalled by Spencer's ongoing influence, Graeme Wood ‘97, wrote a lengthy article, “Richard Spencer Was My High School Classmate,” for the June 2017 The Atlantic, where he is a contributing editor.

Another alumnus, Kurt Eichenwald ‘79, wrote a series of Newsweek cover stories critical of candidate Donald Trump and then spoke critically of President-elect Trump on December 16, 2016, during an interview with Tucker Carlson on Fox television. Later that evening, knowing that Eichenwald had a self-documented seizure disorder, a white nationalist retaliated by sending Eichenwald epileptogenic GIFs over Twitter. The ensuing seizure lasted 8 minutes and was life-threatening. Within hours of a suspect being arrested for aggravated assault with a hate crime attachment, Spencer announced the creation of an online defense fund for the admitted perpetrator. In 2020, Eichenwald won the federal case, along with a $100,000 judgment. The state criminal court case has been deferred indefinitely because of COVID-19.

Ned Price '01 started working for the Central Intelligence Agency in 2006, soon after graduating from college. His 11 years of service included being spokesperson for the National Security Council under President Barack Obama. Price resigned from the CIA in February 2017, immediately outlining in a Washington Post editorial the reasons that he was unable to work in a Trump administration. While some critics suggested that former security agents not speak out, Price and others defended their decisions in a joint New York Times op-ed piece. Price then went to work as a Fellow for the New America Foundation and became a political analyst for NBC. In January 2021, Price was sworn in as the Spokesman for the U.S. Department of State.

Emmanuel Acho '08 has been particularly effective in communicating his perspectives on Black Lives Matter. A former NFL linebacker and ESPN commentator, Acho created a video series on digital media entitled, "Uncomfortable Conversations with a Black Man." In that 2020 series, Acho interviewed white people such as Matthew McConaughey. He also co-hosts Speak For Yourself, a talk show on Fox 1. He has been interviewed himself on such shows as The Late Show with Stephen Colbert and CBS This Morning. In response to racial controversies, Acho is serving as the 2021 guest host for the television show, The Bachelor.

Notable alumni

 Roscoe DeWitt, 1910 - architect and one of the Monuments Men; 1st student enrolled at Terrill 
 Edward Musgrove Dealey, 1910 - president of A.H. Belo; publisher of the Dallas Morning News; 2nd student at Terrill 
 Charles J. Stewart, 1914 - first president and chairman, Manufacturers Hanover Trust; captain, Yale's 1917 football team
 Toddie Lee Wynne, 1915 - investor; co-developer, Six Flags Over Texas, Dallas Cowboys, and 1st private rocket into space
 Lorenzo Sabin, 1917 - vice admiral, US Navy. Recipient of 3 Navy Distinguished Service Medals, the French Legion of Honor, and the British Distinguished Service Order 
 Edwin F. Blair, 1919 - attorney, corporate leader, All-American lineman for the undefeated Yale's 1923 football team, "Mr. Yale"
 Ralph Jester, 1919  - Hollywood costume designer. Twice nominated for an Academy Award, including for The Ten Commandments in 1956
 Stuart P. Wright, 1921 - major general, US Air Force. Recipient of the Legion of Merit, Distinguished Flying Cross, Bronze Star Medal and Air Medal. Athletic Hall of Honor, University of Texas for track, basketball, and football
 Lou Jennings, 1923 - offensive and defensive lineman for the NFL's Providence Steam Rollers and Portsmouth Spartans; professional wrestler
 Jerry Bywaters, 1924 - artist and critic. Director, Dallas Museum of Fine Arts. Professor, Southern Methodist University. 
 John Astin Perkins, 1924 - architect and interior designer
 Deck Shelley, 1925 - running back for the NFL's Portsmouth Spartans, Green Bay Packers, and Chicago Cardinals
 J.B. Andrews, 1926 - quarterback, running back, and linebacker for the NFL's St. Louis Gunners
 C.F. "Shorty" Key, 1927 - fullback for the NWFL's Des Moines Comets and the CAFL's Fresno Wine Crushers; played for 5 different college teams using 4 different names; professional wrestler
 Charley Malone, 1929 - Pro Bowl wide receiver for the NFL’s Washington Redskins
 Alan Lomax, 1930 - ethnomusicologist, musician, political activist, winner of the National Medal of Arts
 Wiley T. Buchanan, Jr., 1931  - Chief of Protocol of the United States and the U.S. Ambassador to Luxembourg and Austria
 James F. Chambers Jr., 1931 - newspaperman; publisher and chairman of the board, Dallas Times Herald Lawrence Marcus, 1934 -  Executive Vice President of Neiman Marcus
 Harry W. Bass, Jr., 1943 - in oil and gas exploration; developer of Vail, Aspen, and Beaver Creek ski resorts; coin collector
 Henry Martin, 1944 - illustrator; New Yorker cartoonist
 Richard Bass, 1946 - in oil and gas exploration; owner of Snowbird ski resort; climber of Seven Summits; rancher
 Stanley J. Seeger, 1947  - art collector
 Michael Rudman, 1956 - theatre director
 John Maxson, 1958 - sound engineer; winner, Emmy Award; co-founder, Showco and Vari*Lite
 Ray Lee Hunt, 1961 - in oil and gas exploration; Chair of Hunt Consolidated, Inc.
 Steve Miller, 1961 - musician
 Lewis MacAdams, 1962 - poet, journalist, activist, and filmmaker
 Boz Scaggs, 1962 - musician
 Boomer Castleman, 1963 - musician
 Michael R. Levy, 1964 - founder and publisher of Texas Monthly John Nance, 1964 - writer, pilot, aviation analyst, attorney
 Robert Hoffman, 1965 - owner of Coca-Cola Bottling Group (Southwest); co-founder of National Lampoon; art collector
 Tommy Lee Jones, 1965 - Academy Award-winning actor; rancher; 1st team All-Ivy League guard on Harvard's football team in 1968; polo player
 William Hootkins, 1966 - stage and character actor
 Mike Estep, 1967 - professional tennis player and coach
 David Laney, 1967 - attorney, Amtrak chair, Republican fundraiser
 Jerry Carlson, 1968 - film scholar and filmmaker; professor, City University of New York
 Charles Nearburg, 1968 - in oil and gas exploration; world-record-setting race car driver
 John Steakley, 1969 - science fiction novelist; author of Armor and Vampire$ Jeffrey Swann, 1969 - classical pianist; faculty at New York University"Young Pianist to Present Recital at SMU Wednesday." The Dallas Morning News, May 15, 1966. Retrieved 2010-07-11.
 Robert Decherd, 1969 -  CEO and President of A.H. Belo, a media conglomerate that includes the Dallas Morning News Steven D. Wolens, 1969 - attorney; Texas state representative
 Stephen Scott Arnold, 1971 - Emmy-winning composer, writer of jingles, and developer of sonic branding
 Mark D. Jordan, 1971 - Andrew Mellon Professor, Harvard Divinity School; scholar of gender, sexuality, and theology
 Ivan Stang, 1971 - co-founder of Church of the Subgenius; author of High Weirdness by Mail George Bayoud, 1973 - real estate developer; former Texas Secretary of State
 Robert M. Edsel, 1975 - in oil and gas exploration; historical activist; author of Monuments Men and Rescuing Da Vinci David M. Lutken, 1975 - musician, actor, playwright, director; Woody Guthrie performer and interpreter 
 Alan Stern, 1975 - planetary scientist; principal investigator for NASA's New Horizons project
 Michael Weiss, 1976 - jazz pianist, composer
 :fi:Markus Nummi, 1977 - Finnish film director, screenwriter, poet, novelist
 H. Ross Perot, Jr., 1977 - real estate developer
 Mark Stern, 1977 - mathematician; professor at Duke University
 Kerry Sulkowicz, 1977 - business consultant, advisor, psychiatrist
 Randall Zisk, 1977 - television producer and director, Monk, Lois and Clark, the Mentalist Wallace L. Hall, 1978 - in oil and gas exploration; outspoken member of the University of Texas Board of Regents
 Paul Rice, 1978 - social entrepreneur; President and CEO of Fair Trade USA
 Jeff Turpin, 1978 - in oil and gas exploration; in tennis, college All American and former Grand Prix Tour professional
 Kurt Eichenwald, 1979 - journalist, senior editor, Newsweek, author, The Informant Frank Rolfe, 1979 - one of the country's largest owners of mobile home parks. Co-owner, Mobile Home University
 Kenneth A. Hersh, 1981 - CEO, NGP Energy Capital Management.  CEO, George W. Bush Presidential Center
 Jeff Miller, 1982 - President, CEO, and Chairman of the Board, Halliburton Corporation; former professional rodeo roper
 David Hudgins, 1983 - television writer and producer, Everwood, Friday Night Lights, Parenthood Clark Hunt, 1983 - co-owner and chairman of the NFL's Kansas City Chiefs and Major League Soccer's FC Dallas; former captain and Academic All American, SMU varsity soccer 
 Craig Zisk, 1983 - television and film producer and director, Weeds, The Larry Sanders Show,  The English Patient Victor Vescovo, 1984 - underwater explorer, pilot, mountain climber, private equity investor
 Steve Jurvetson, 1985 - venture capitalist; former managing director of Draper Fisher Jurvetson
 Charles Olivier, 1987 - Emmy-winning writer and producer
 Owen Wilson, 1987 - actor, writer, producer
 Paul Wylie, 1987 - figure skater; Olympic silver medalist
 Rhett Miller, 1989 - musician; songwriter; lead singer of the Old 97's
 Luke Wilson, 1990 - actor
 Ali Rowghani, 1991 - managing partner, YC Continuity at Y Combinator; former chief financial officer at Pixar and former chief operating officer at Twitter
 Sam Dealey, 1992 - journalist and media consultant; former Editor in Chief of the Washington Times Matthew Silverman, 1994 - President of Baseball Operations, Tampa Bay Rays
 Brian Auld, 1995 - President, Tampa Bay Rays
 Richard B. Spencer, 1997 - neo-nazi; proponent of the alt-right; President, National Policy Institute
 Graeme Wood, 1997 - political journalist; contributing editor at The Atlantic; lecturer at Yale
 Evan Daugherty, 2000 - screenwriter, Divergent, Snow White and the Huntsman, Teenage Mutant Ninja Turtles''
 Kalen Thornton, 2000 - marketing director for Nike; former linebacker for the Dallas Cowboys
 Miles Fisher, 2001 - actor 
 Taylor Jenkins, 2003 - head basketball coach for the NBA’s Memphis Grizzlies 
 Sam Acho, 2007 - ESPN analyst, author, former NFL linebacker
 Emmanuel Acho, 2008 - Fox Sports analyst, social commentator, television host, former NFL linebacker.
 Ty Montgomery, 2011 - wide receiver, running back, and kickoff returner for the NFL’s New Orleans Saints

Notes

References

External links

St. Mark's School of Texas website

Educational institutions established in 1906
Independent Schools Association of the Southwest
Boys' schools in Texas
Private K-12 schools in Dallas
1906 establishments in Texas